Halluin is a commune in the Nord department in northern France.

Geography
It is located at the north of the Métropole Européenne de Lille, on the Belgian border, contiguous with the Belgian town of Menen.

Population

Transport

The Halluin railway station, closed in the 1970s, was situated on the Somain-Halluin Railway. The town is now served by buses of Ilévia.

The A22 autoroute links the town to Lille and Belgium.

Heraldry

Politics
An erstwhile bastion of the left, Halluin owes its nickname Halluin the Red to the powerful trade unions who used their influence to support Communist mayors during the interwar period. However, since the 1990s Halluin has become gentrified (see also below), and in the 2007 and 2012 presidential elections the town backed Nicolas Sarkozy.

In the 2014 mayoral elections, 62% of voters chose right-wing parties: 
Gustave Dassonville (UMP) received 40% of the votes and JeanChristophe Destailleur (Centre-right) received 22% of the votes. Left-wing parties, with 38% of the votes, were defeated, and Gustave Dassonville was elected. Six years later, in 2020,  JeanChristophe Destailleur (Centre-right) was elected mayor of Halluin.

Despite the noted gentrification of Halluin, the neighbouring town of Menen, Belgium, situated within walking distance of central Halluin, underwent a simultaneous radicalization, given the municipality's attempts to ban its employees from speaking French to Francophone people whose command of Dutch may be limited, and to use sign language instead. While some townsfolk of Halluin's adjoining conurbation may have regarded this as a brave attempt to enforce Flemish supremacy over Francophone neighbours, others, including Francophone neighbours themselves, and international observers may have regarded such a measure as allegedly fanatical and insensitive to the needs of Francophone neighbours with limited command of Dutch. International press comment was provoked by these municipal regulations.

Points of interest
 Parc Arboretum du Manoir aux Loups

Twin towns
Halluin is twinned with:
 Menen, Belgium
 Oer-Erkenschwick, Germany - since 1969
 North Tyneside, England - since 1994
 Pniewy, Poland - since 1998
 Lübbenau, Germany - since 2000
 Kočevje, Slovenia - since 2000
 Zulte, Belgium - since 2010

See also
Communes of the Nord department

References

External links

 What happens to a border, if the river changes course ? 'Tim Traveller' in YouTube
 Halluin official website (in French)
 100% Halluin (in French)
 Halluin Tawhid Masjeed official website (in French)

Communes of Nord (French department)
Divided cities
French Flanders